Almaty Astana Motors is a professional road bicycle racing team from Kazakhstan.

Team roster

Major wins
2022
Grand Prix Velo Alanya, Igor Chzhan
2023
 Stage 3 Tour of Sharjah, Rudolf Remkhi

References

External links

Cycling teams based in Kazakhstan
Sports teams in Astana
UCI Continental Teams (Europe)